The bumpy rocket frog (Litoria inermis), also known as Peters' frog, is a species of frog in the subfamily Pelodryadinae. It is abundant and endemic to Australia, where it is found from northern Australia south to Maryborough, Queensland.

Description
They are brown or grey with many small warts and darker patches on their backs. Their toes are half to three-quarters webbed, and the fingers are not webbed.

Vocalizations
Similar to the striped rocket frog (L. nasuta), their calls are a few 'clucks', then a rapid series of 'weks' for some seconds, then a few more 'clucks'.

Habitat
The natural habitats of the Bumpy rocket frog are subtropical or tropical swamps, dry savanna, subtropical or tropical dry lowland grassland, and intermittent freshwater marshes, especially around rain-filled pools.

Reproduction
Their eggs are laid in clumps of about 96 to 330 brown eggs on temporary pool surfaces.

Footnotes

References

Litoria
Amphibians of Western Australia
Amphibians of the Northern Territory
Amphibians of Queensland
Endemic fauna of Australia
Amphibians described in 1867
Taxa named by Wilhelm Peters
Taxonomy articles created by Polbot
Frogs of Australia